The Inuvik Region or Beaufort Delta Region is one of five administrative regions in the Northwest Territories of Canada. According to Municipal and Community Affairs the region consists of eight communities with the regional office situated in Inuvik. Most of the communities are in the Beaufort Sea area and are a mixture of Inuit (Inuvialuit) and First Nations (mostly Gwich'in).

Formerly, there was also a Statistics Canada designated census division named Inuvik Region, Northwest Territories, which was abolished in the 2011 Canadian Census. The territorial extent of this census division was somewhat larger than the administrative region of the same name.

Administrative Region communities
The Inuvik Region administrative entity includes the following communities:

References

External links

Inuvik Region at Municipal and Community Affairs